Mixed motive may refer to:

Mixed motives (math), Voevodsky's construction of the derived category of algebraic geometric mixed motives
"Mixed motive" discrimination, in constitutional law